Asgariabad (also Romanized as ʿAsgarīābād; also known as ʿAsgarīābād-e Soflá) is a village in Baladeh Rural District, Khorramabad District, Tonekabon County, Mazandaran Province, Iran. At the 2006 census, its population was 65, in 25 families.

References 

Populated places in Tonekabon County